Dino Crescentini (22 September 1947 – 22 June 2008) was a Sammarinese bobsledder and racing driver. He competed in the two man event at the 1994 Winter Olympics. He was killed while taking part in a motor race in Canada in 2008.

Biography
Crescentini was born in San Marino in 1947, and moved to Michigan during the 1970s. He was living in Rochester Hills when he qualified to compete at the Winter Olympics. Along with Mike Crocenzi, Crescentini competed in the two man event at the 1994 Winter Olympics in Lillehammer, Norway. Crescentini was also the flag bearers for San Marino at the Winter Olympics.

Following the Olympics, Crescentini became a race car driver. In June 2008, at a racing festival at Mosport Park, Crescentini was killed after his car flipped over and hit a wall. He was taken to the hospital in Bowmanville where he died.

See also
San Marino national bobsleigh team

References

External links
 

1947 births
2008 deaths
Sammarinese male bobsledders
Olympic bobsledders of San Marino
Bobsledders at the 1994 Winter Olympics
Racing drivers who died while racing
Sport deaths in Canada